The Star Chamber was a notorious English court of law.

Star Chamber may also refer to:

 Star Chamber (play), a 1936 play by Noël Coward
 The Star Chamber, a 1983 thriller film starring Michael Douglas
 Star Chamber: The Harbinger Saga, an online collectible card game